Tun Sharifah Rodziah binti Syed Alwi Barakbah (1920 – 12 March 2000) was the third wife of Tunku Abdul Rahman Putra Al-Haj, the founding father and first Prime Minister of Malaysia.

Early life
Born in 1920, Sharifah Rodziah is of Hadhrami-Malay descent; her Arab ancestors had migrated from Hadhramaut and settled in Kedah for several generations. Being of the Barakbah clan, she is related to Syed Sheh Hassan Barakbah, the former Yang di-Pertua Negeri (Governor) of Penang.

Marriage
Sharifah Rodziah was actually the younger sister of Tunku's university mate in England, Syed Omar Barakbah. Tunku and Sharifah Rodziah married in 1939 when he returned to Kedah from England upon hearing news that World War II was about to erupt in Europe.

She became Tunku's third wife after the death of Meriam Chong and his divorce from Violet Coulson. However, the marriage did not result in any offspring. Sharifah Rodziah became a loving stepmother to Tunku's children from his first marriage to Meriam Chong. They later adopted three children, Sulaiman, Mariam and Faridah.

Tunku Abdul Rahman's eldest daughter, Tunku Khadijah said in an interview to The Star that Sharifah Rodziah "loved my father dearly to a fault. She did not want to share him with anyone else".

Influence
Sharifah Rodziah played an important role in rallying political support for her husband during Malaysia's tumultuous formative years.

Death
She died due to pneumonia, in Penang, on 12 March 2000 at the age of 80 and was buried next to her husband's grave, Tunku Abdul Rahman Putra Al-Haj at Kedah Royal Mausoleum in Langgar, Kedah.

Honours

Honours of Malaysia
  :
  Grand Commander of the Order of the Defender of the Realm (SMN) – Tun (1970)
  :
  Knight Grand Commander of the Order of the Crown of Terengganu (SPMT) – Dato' (1964)

Places named after her
Several places were named after her, including:
SMK Tun Sharifah Rodziah in Alor Setar, Kedah
SMK Agama Sharifah Rodziah in Telok Mas, Melaka
Tun Sharifah Rodziah Sea Base, located at Eastern Sabah Security Zone (ESSZONE), Sabah
Piala Tun Sharifah Rodziah

See also 
 Spouse of the Prime Minister of Malaysia

References

Sources
 Asiaweek.com, 24 March 2000.
 Putera Negara; 1987, Firma Publishing, Aziz Zarina Ahmad.

Spouses of prime ministers of Malaysia
Malaysian people of Yemeni descent
1920 births
2000 deaths
Grand Commanders of the Order of the Defender of the Realm
Knights Grand Commander of the Order of the Crown of Terengganu
Malaysian people of Malay descent
Malaysian Muslims
People from Kedah